Proactivator polypeptide-like 1 is a protein in humans that is encoded by the PSAPL1 gene. It is a member of the saposin family of proteins.

References

Further reading 

Genes on human chromosome 4
Pseudogenes